Steven "Steve" A. Morrow is an American production sound mixer. Morrow has been nominated for the Academy Award for Best Sound or Best Achievement in Sound Mixing a total of three times for his work on La La Land, A Star is Born, and Ford v Ferrari. He has been nominated for three BAFTA Film Awards for Best Sound for La La Land, A Star is Born, and Ford v Ferrari.

His work on critically acclaimed musical-drama La La Land earned him many awards and nominations including Academy Award for Best Sound Mixing (shared with Andy Nelson and Ai-Ling Lee) at the 89th Academy Awards.

Awards
 Nominated: Academy Award for Best Sound Mixing - Ford v Ferrari
 Nominated: Academy Award for Best Sound Mixing - A Star is Born
 Nominated: Academy Award for Best Sound Mixing - La La Land 
 Nominated: BAFTA Award for Best Sound - Ford v Ferrari 
 Nominated: BAFTA Award for Best Sound - A Star is Born 
 Nominated: BAFTA Award for Best Sound - La La Land 
 Winner: Cinema Audio Society Award for Outstanding Achievement in Sound Mixing for a Motion Picture – Live Action - La La Land 
 Nominated: Satellite Award for Best Sound - La La Land

References

External links
 

Living people
American audio engineers
Year of birth missing (living people)